Steal Another Day is an album released in 2003 by country music artist Steve Wariner and his first studio album for SelecTone Records. The album produced two singles on the Billboard Hot Country Singles chart "I'm Your Man" and "Snowfall on the Sand" which reached 58 and 52 respectively.

Track listing

Personnel

 Eddie Bayers – drums
 Richard Bennett – electric guitar
 Eric Darken – percussion
 Connie Ellisor – violin
 Ron Gannaway – drums
 Carl Gorodetzky – violin
 Lloyd Green – steel guitar
 John Kingsley – background vocals
 Aubrey Haynie – fiddle, mandolin
 Shane Hicks – keyboards, piano
 Lance Hoppen – background vocals
 Larry Hoppen – background vocals
 Rob Ickes – dobro
 John Barlow Jarvis – keyboards, piano
 Mike Johnson – steel guitar
 Billy Kirsch – piano
 Bill LaBounty – background vocals
 Lee Larrison – violin
 Woody Lingle – bass guitar
 Mac McAnally – background vocals
 Bob Mason – cello
 Jimmy Mattingly – fiddle
 Gary Van Osdale – viola
 Kim Parent – background vocals
 Lee Roy Parnell – slide guitar
 Matt Rollings – Wurlitzer
 Allen Shamblin – vocals on "I Really Don't Have Anything"
 Pamela Sixfin – violin
 Harry Stinson – background vocals
 Alan Umstead – violin
 Billy Joe Walker Jr. – acoustic guitar
 Steve Wariner – bass guitar, drum programming, 12-string electric guitar, acoustic guitar, baritone guitar, classical guitar, electric guitar, resonator guitar, percussion, slide guitar, lead vocals, background vocals
 Biff Watson – acoustic guitar
 Bergen White – string arrangements
 Kristin Wilkinson – viola
 Glenn Worf – bass guitar
 Reggie Young – baritone guitar, electric guitar

Chart performance

Album

References

Steve Wariner albums
2003 albums